John Drebinger (March 23, 1891 – October 22, 1979), nicknamed "Drebby", was an American sportswriter in New York City for over 50 years. Between 1929 and 1963, he wrote the lead story in The New York Times for every World Series contest, a total of 203 games.

Biography
Drebinger graduated from Curtis High School on Staten Island and went to work for the Staten Island Advance in 1911. He moved to The New York Times in 1923, and worked there until retiring in 1964. Drebinger estimated that he traveled  in his career as a sportswriter covering the Brooklyn Dodgers, New York Giants, and New York Yankees.

In 1973, Drebinger was honored by the Baseball Writers' Association of America with the J. G. Taylor Spink Award for distinguished baseball writing. Recipients of the Spink Award are recognized at the National Baseball Hall of Fame and Museum in what is commonly referred to as the "writers wing" of the Hall of Fame.

Drebinger died at a nursing home in North Carolina in October 1979. He was survived by his wife, Madeline, and a son.

References

1891 births
1979 deaths
Baseball writers
The New York Times sportswriters
People from Staten Island
Sportswriters from New York (state)
BBWAA Career Excellence Award recipients